Abdul Rahman Al-Zaid (born 11 January 1959) is a retired Saudi football referee. He is known for supervising two matches during the 1998 FIFA World Cup in France.

References

External links
 
 
 Profile

FIFA World Cup referees
1998 FIFA World Cup referees
Saudi Arabian football referees
1959 births
Living people
AFC Asian Cup referees